Galerius Maximus was a Roman senator, who was active during the mid third century. He was suffect consul for an undetermined nundinium in the early 240s. Galerius Maximus is best known as the proconsul of Roman Africa who condemned Bishop Cyprian to death for not obeying the dictates of emperors Valerian and Gallienus and making public sacrifices.

References 

3rd-century Romans
Suffect consuls of Imperial Rome
Roman governors of Africa